Lankenau Environmental Science Magnet High School (commonly referred as Lankenau High School) is a district-run magnet high school in Upper Roxborough, Northwest Philadelphia. It is a part of the School District of Philadelphia. The school's Advanced Placement participation was 34 percent during the 2014 school year. The school has also received a Bronze recognition by U.S. News & World Report's list of Best U.S. High Schools from 2012 through 2014.

The school is near the border with Montgomery County and occupies a wooded area. It described itself as the "country campus for the college bound".

History
The school has a garden. In 2016 vandals damaged the garden with a vehicle.

Demographics
Of the school's 340 students, 99 percent identify as minorities. 94.7 percent identify as Black, 3.6 percent as Hispanic, 1 percent as Other, 0.3 percent as Asian, and 0.3 percent as White.

References

External links

Lankenau Environmental Science Magnet High School Website

Lankenau Environmental Science Magnet High School
School District of Philadelphia
Lankenau Environmental Science Magnet High School
Public high schools in Pennsylvania